Corydoras julii (also known as the julii cory or leopard catfish) is a small freshwater catfish native to eastern Brazil. It is often confused with Corydoras trilineatus, the three stripe corydoras.

Physical appearance 
Corydoras julii is a relatively small species of fish, growing to be no more than 52 millimeters in length. Its skin is a whitish-gray, almost transparent color with fine black spotting all over and a horizontal stripe that reaches halfway down its mid-body. This pattern helps distinguish it from the more common three stripe corydoras, which tends to have larger reticulations, as opposed to spots, and a longer mid-body stripe. C. julii might be further distinguished from C. trilineatus by the spotted pattern on its head; however, C. trilineatus can also show this pattern on occasion. Females are larger and rounder than males.

Behavior

Feeding 
Corydoras julii, like almost all Corydoras species, are bottom-feeding scavengers. Their diet consists primarily of small invertebrates which they sift from the substrate, expelling the particles of sand and sediment through their gill openings. In aquaria, they are fed sinking pellets rich in insect and other invertebrate proteins, as well as live or frozen foods such as bloodworms, daphnia, brine shrimp, and California blackworms (Lumbriculus variegatus). Although they will often consume sinking algae wafers, these are not considered to be nutritionally appropriate.

Breeding 

After sexual maturity, corydoras spawning appears to be triggered by storms. During this storm, the fish eat increased amounts of insects. The water gradually decreases temperature over the course of a few days.

Corydoras fish breed in a position resembling a "T formation". In this formation, the female swims up to the male's abdomen, and consumes sperm released by the male. The sperm rapidly travels though the female's intestinal tract and fertilizes the eggs in the cloaca. Small, white, sturdy eggs are laid on plant leaves in the wild, but in an aquarium, they appear to prefer smooth surfaces such as the glass. Adult corydoras have been known to eat their own eggs.

In captivity, corydoras are typically bred in groups in which males outnumber females. This often includes only two males and one female. Corydoras are easy to breed and often spawn in the aquarium with no help from the aquarist. Addition of large amounts of cool water to the tank can be used to simulate a storm and trigger spawning. A diet high in protein (e.g. living California blackworms) can aid aso breeding.

In Aquaria 
Corydoras julii are small, unaggressive fish. They are shoaling fish, and are typically kept in groups when in captivity. They are rarely available commercially. Fish labelled as "julii corys" for sale are often the misidentified C. leopardus or C. trilineatus.

References

External links 
 

Corydoras
Fishkeeping
Fish described in 1906